The Baripada Railway Station serves Baripada, the headquarters of Mayurbhanj district in the Indian state of Odisha.

History
In 1905, Mayurbhanj State Railway linked Rupsa with Baripada on the Howrah–Chennai main line through a narrow-gauge line, then extended it further. The Rupsa-Baripada-Bangriposi line was converted to broad gauge between 1996 and 2006. Currently, Train No. 12891 leaves Baripada at 5:10 AM and reaches Bhubaneswar at 10:00 AM. The return train leaves Bhubaneswar at 5:10 PM and reaches Baripada at 10:00 PM.

Simlipal National Park
Jashipur via NH 6  is normally considered to be the gateway to Simlipal National Park, but it can also be reached from Baripada, which is 50 km away. The normal entry is through the Pithabhata check gate. In addition to wildlife, Simlipal National Park offers views of the waterfalls Joranda Falls and Barehipani Falls.

References

External links
 Trains at Baripada

Railway stations in Mayurbhanj district
Kharagpur railway division
Railway stations opened in 1905
1905 establishments in India